Terry Downes, BEM (9 May 1936 – 6 October 2017) was a British middleweight boxer, occasional film actor, and businessman. He was nicknamed the "Paddington Express" for his aggressive fighting style.

At the time of his death, Downes was Britain's oldest surviving former world champion. He held the world middleweight title (the version recognised by Europe, New York, and Massachusetts) for ten months from 1961-62.

Early life

Terry Downes was born in Paddington, London. His father Richard worked as a mechanic, and his mother Hilda in a department store. Downes boxed as a junior for the Fisher ABC. He moved with his parents to the United States in 1952, while still a teenager, to live with his trapeze artist sister Sylvia, who had lost an arm in a traffic accident, going on to serve in the US Marine Corps from 1954–56, being recruited after boxing against them for the YMCA. In the Marines he won several amateur trophies, including the all-services championship and the Amateur Golden Gloves. He missed out on selection for the US Olympic team, being ruled ineligible on residence grounds, and after his term of service, he returned to London and turned professional.

Professional boxing career

Managed by Sam Burns, Downes won his first two pro fights before a defeat to future world champion Dick Tiger. After building up a record of 16 wins and 3 defeats, Downes won the British middleweight title, vacated by Pat McAteer's retirement, by beating Phil Edwards on 30 September 1958 at the Harringay Arena, London. In 1959, Downes lost and won back the title from John "Cowboy" McCormack. On 5 July 1960, Downes successfully defended the title against Edwards again.

Downes lost his first World Title shot to Paul Pender in Boston in January 1961. The following July, however, Downes fought Pender again, this time in London, and defeated the American in front of a raucous Wembley crowd, with Pender retiring at the end of the ninth round with cuts over both eyes. Downes was recognised as world champion by The Ring magazine in August 1961, and was named Sports Writers' Association Sportsman of the Year later that year. Pender won the title back the following year, defeating Downes in Boston once more, this time on points.

Downes responded to the loss of his title by winning his next seven bouts, including a win over Sugar Ray Robinson in September 1962. Robinson was, however, 41 at the time, and when asked after the fight how it felt to beat a boxer of such esteem, Downes famously replied, "I didn't beat Sugar Ray, I beat his ghost." Downes moved up to light heavyweight in 1963, winning his first three fights at the weight before facing Willie Pastrano for the world title in Manchester on 30 November 1964. Downes was knocked down twice in the 11th round, while reportedly well ahead on points, and Pastrano retained his title when referee Andrew Smyth controversially waved it off – it was to be Downes' last fight.

Downes was famous for a number of quips. After a particularly brutal fight early in his career against Dick Tiger, Downes was asked who he wanted to fight next. He replied, "The bastard who made this match", in reference to Mickey Duff.

Downes fought six world champions and beat three: Robinson, Pender and Joey Giardello. His record was: 44 fights, 35 wins (28 KOs), 9 losses.

Acting career

Post-boxing, Downes acted occasionally between 1965 and 1990, usually appearing a thug, villain or bodyguard. One of his more prominent roles was in Roman Polanski's 1967 film The Fearless Vampire Killers, in which he played "Koukol", a hunchbacked servant. His other film credits included appearances in A Study in Terror (1965), Five Ashore in Singapore (1967), The Golden Lady (1979), If You Go Down in the Woods Today (1981), and the Derek Jarman film Caravaggio (1986).

Films

A Study in Terror (1965) - Chunky
The Fearless Vampire Killers (1967) - Koukol, the Servant
Five Ashore in Singapore (1967) - Sgt. Gruber
The Golden Lady (1979) - Trainer
If You Go Down in the Woods Today (1981) - Woodsman
Caravaggio (1986) - Bodyguard

Other business interests

After his retirement, Downes owned a nightclub. and worked as a boxing manager, working with British title challenger Colin Lake in the late 1960s.

Personal life

Downes and his wife Barbara (nee Clarke) were married from 1958 until his death in 2017. They had four children and eight grandchildren, one of whom includes prominent football writer and comedian James McNicholas. They lived for many years in a large detached house in Milespit Hill, Mill Hill, London NW7.

Downes was awarded the British Empire Medal in the 2012 Birthday Honours, in recognition of his sporting achievements and charity work. He died on 6 October 2017, aged 81.

Professional boxing record

See also
List of middleweight boxing champions
List of British middleweight boxing champions

References

External links

 
 "The Fighter at Home with Yogi Bear",  Sports Illustrated profile from 1962

1936 births
2017 deaths
Middleweight boxers
World boxing champions
United States Marines
English expatriates in the United States
English male boxers
People from Paddington
Recipients of the British Empire Medal